The Sherlocks are an indie rock band from South Yorkshire.

The band consists of brothers, Kiaran & Brandon Crook along with Alex Procter & Trent Jackson.

History

Early career
The band played at Reading and Leeds Festivals in August 2015. 
The single 'Heart of Gold' received airplay from BBC Radio 1's Annie Mac, Huw Stephens, Greg James and BBC 6 Music’s Steve Lamacq. The fourth single, "Last Night", was released in February 2016, with the band being invited by BBC Introducing to play the SXSW festival in March 2016 in Austin, Texas. The band also played in Manchester as part of Dot to Dot festival in May 2016, followed by once more playing at the Leeds and Reading Festivals 2016. In 2016, they supported The Libertines as part of their Arena Tour.

The Sherlocks released their fifth single, "Will You Be There?", on 15 September 2016.

The Sherlocks announced they had been signed by Infectious Music on 19 December 2016.

A limited edition 7" vinyl of "Will You Be There?" was released in early January 2017, entering the Official UK Vinyl Singles Chart at number 1 on 13 January. On 26 January 2017, the band released their sixth single "Was It Really Worth It?", with the video appearing online on Valentine's Day (14 February) 2017, which also topped the Official UK Vinyl Singles Chart.

In early 2020, brothers Josh Davidson and Andy Davidson decided to leave the band and later in November 2020; the band announced that Alex Procter would join the band on guitar with Trent Jackson on bass. A new album was also mentioned at this time for release in 2021.

Live for the Moment (2017)
On 25 April 2017, The Sherlocks announced their debut album Live for the Moment, released on 18 August 2017, as well as their seventh single "Chasing Shadows'", of which the video was released on 27 April 2017.

On 8 June 2019 the band played at Elland Road  stadium for the celebration of 100 years of Leeds United, supporting Kaiser Chiefs and The Vaccines.

Under Your Sky (2019)
On 17 June 2019 it was announced the band would release their second album, Under Your Sky on 4 October 2019. They also announced a UK and European tour on this date, which they will play the songs from their new album alongside Live for the Moment tracks.

On 17 June 2019, The Sherlocks also announced that their track, "NYC (Sing It Loud)" would feature on BBC Radio 1, played by Annie Mac.

On 12 July 2019, the band played at Castlefield Bowl supporting The Kooks alongside other indie band, Sea Girls.

On 4 October 2019, the band released their second studio album, Under Your Sky. The band played the song on their live UK tour in February–March 2020.

Discography

Studio albums
 Live for the Moment (2017) No. 6 UK
 Under Your Sky (2019) No. 20 UK
 World I Understand (2022) No. 9 UK
 People Like Me & You (2023)

References

External links
 Bees! BEES! BEEEEEEEEEEES!

English indie rock groups
Infectious Music artists
Musical groups from Sheffield